John Sharpe may refer to:

Johannes Sharpe (ca. 1360-after 1415), German philosopher
John Sharpe (cricketer) (1866–1936), English test cricketer
John Sharpe (tennis) (born 1945), Canadian Davis Cup player
John Sharpe (publisher), American naval officer and publisher of economic books about distributism
John Sharpe (footballer) (born 1957), English football (soccer) player
John Sharpe (courtier) (died 1518), courtier to King Henry VII
John Sharpe (born 1967), Australian convicted of the speargun Sharpe family murders
John Henry Sharpe, Premier of Bermuda, 1975–1977
John Robin Sharpe (born c. 1933), Canadian convicted of child sexual abuse in R v Sharpe
John Sharpe (MP), British Member of Parliament for Callington, 1754–1756
John Walker Sharpe (1916–1997), Scottish physicist
Jon Sharpe (died 2004), original author of The Trailsman series of Western novels

See also
John Sharp (disambiguation)
Jack Sharpe (disambiguation)